Senran Kagura: Estival Versus is a hack and slash video game developed by Tamsoft and published by Xseed Games. It is part of the Senran Kagura series. It was released for PlayStation 4 and PlayStation Vita in March 16, 2016, and on PC on March 17, 2017. It follows girls of rival kunoichi schools as they are teleported to a mysterious tropical island-like world and are challenged to fight for the secrets of shinobi lore. The game was praised for its gameplay and story, but its heavy fan service was controversial, with some reviewers calling the ecchi themes too intense for a casual player.

Reception 
The game received an aggregate score of 67/100 on Metacritic, for its PlayStation 4 version, indicating "mixed or average reviews". The Vita and PC versions had similar scores, both receiving an aggregate score of 71/100.

CJ Andriessen of Destructoid rated the game 75/100, saying he enjoyed the game's "combination of flashy action and fan service", but said that the story does the game no favors and that it was not the best in the series. He called the Vita version playable, but a downgrade in most ways from the PS4 version.

Jason Bohn of Hardcore Gamer rated the game 3/5 points, calling the game "aggressively silly" and "dumb fun". He stated that while the game could be seen as objectifying women, it was done with a "wink and a nudge" and he would not be embarrassed to play it with his wife in the room on account of the characters being strong.

Robert Ramsey of Push Square rated the game 6/10 stars, calling it a "reasonably solid hack and slasher", and calling the game's online multiplayer "shockingly robust", although stating that he struggled to find full rooms due to the low multiplayer population.

References 

2016 video games
Action video games
Erotic video games
Hack and slash games
Multiplayer and single-player video games
PlayStation 4 games
PlayStation Vita games
Senran Kagura
Video games about ninja
Video games developed in Japan
Video game sequels
Windows games
Xseed Games games